Hyperaeschrella nigribasis is a moth in the family Notodontidae first described by George Hampson in 1893. It is found in Taiwan, southern China, Vietnam, Thailand, Myanmar, Assam, Sikkim, Nepal, Pakistan and Afghanistan. The wingspan is 33–40 mm.

References

Moths described in 1893
Notodontidae